The 1995–96 Magyar Kupa (English: Hungarian Cup) was the 56th season of Hungary's annual knock-out cup football competition.

Quarter-finals

|}

Semi-finals

|}

Final

See also
 1995–96 Nemzeti Bajnokság I

References

External links
 Official site 
 soccerway.com

1995–96 in Hungarian football
1995–96 domestic association football cups
1995-96